K111 or K-111 may refer to:

K-111 (Kansas highway), a state highway in Kansas 
Symphony, K. 111+120 (Mozart)